Iveta Benešová and Bethanie Mattek were the defending champions, but they chose not to participate this year.

Seeds

Draw

External links
Main Draw

Copa Sony Ericsson Colsanitas - Doubles
Copa Colsanitas